Lindsay Davenport and Martina Hingis were the defending champions but Hingis chose to compete in the women's doubles main draw this year. Davenport played alongside Mary Joe Fernández but they were eliminated in the round robin.

Jana Novotná and Barbara Schett defeated Martina Navratilova and Selima Sfar in the final, 6–0, 7–6(7–2) to win the ladies' invitation doubles tennis title at the 2014 Wimbledon Championships.

Draw

Final

Group A
Standings are determined by: 1. number of wins; 2. number of matches; 3. in two-players-ties, head-to-head records; 4. in three-players-ties, percentage of sets won, or of games won; 5. steering-committee decision.

Group B
Standings are determined by: 1. number of wins; 2. number of matches; 3. in two-players-ties, head-to-head records; 4. in three-players-ties, percentage of sets won, or of games won; 5. steering-committee decision.

References
 Draw

Women's Invitation Doubles